Franklin Wilson Carraway (October 16, 1904 – November 7, 1972) was an American politician in the state of Florida.

He served in the Florida State Senate from 1955 to 1965 as a Democratic member for the 8th district. From 1962 to 1963, he was president of the Senate. He also served briefly in the Florida House of Representatives, from 1945 to 1950.

References

1904 births
1972 deaths
People from Tallahassee, Florida
Businesspeople from Florida
Democratic Party members of the Florida House of Representatives
Democratic Party Florida state senators
Pork Chop Gang
20th-century American politicians
20th-century American businesspeople